The 1931 Campeonato Carioca, the 26th edition of the Rio de Janeiro state championship. Eleven teams participated. América won the title for the 5th time. No teams were relegated. Carioca joined the league after Syrio e Libanez left following the 1930 season.

Participating teams

Format 
The tournament was disputed in a double round-robin format, with the team with the most points winning the title.

Championship

References 

Campeonato Carioca seasons
Carioca